The 2018 Internationaux de Tennis de Blois was a professional tennis tournament played on clay courts. It was the sixth edition of the tournament which was part of the 2018 ATP Challenger Tour. It took place in Blois, France between 18 and 24 June 2018.

Singles main-draw entrants

Seeds

 1 Rankings are as of 11 June 2018.

Other entrants
The following players received wildcards into the singles main draw:
  Jaimee Floyd Angele
  Calvin Hemery
  Alexandre Müller
  Stéphane Robert

The following players received entry into the singles main draw as special exempts:
  Roberto Marcora
  Johan Tatlot

The following players received entry from the qualifying draw:
  Marcelo Tomás Barrios Vera
  Tristan Lamasine
  Jules Okala
  Mikael Ymer

The following player received entry as a lucky loser:
  Harri Heliövaara

Champions

Singles

  Scott Griekspoor def.  Félix Auger-Aliassime 6–4, 6–4.

Doubles

  Fabrício Neis /  David Vega Hernández def.  Hsieh Cheng-peng /  Rameez Junaid 7–6(7–4), 6–1.

External links
Official Website

2018 ATP Challenger Tour
June 2018 sports events in France
2018